Damien Cahalane (born 10 August 1992) is an Irish hurler and Gaelic footballer who plays as a centre-back for club sides St Finbarr's and Castlehaven and as a full-back at senior level with the Cork county hurling team.

Early life
Cahalane was born in Wilton, Cork. His father, Niall Cahalane, and his uncle, John Cleary, won All-Ireland medals as members of the Cork senior football team in 1989 and 1990. His aunt, Nollaig Cleary, won nine All-Ireland medals with Cork. His brother, Conor Cahalane, has also played for Cork.

Playing career

College
Cahalane first came to prominence as a dual player with Coláiste an Spioraid Naoimh in Bishopstown. Having played both codes at every grade, he won a Cork Colleges Under-16½ B medal in 2009.

University
As a student at University College Cork, Cahalane also became involved in Gaelic games. On 8 March 2012, he won an All-Ireland Freshers Championship medal following a 0-24 to 3-11 defeat of the University of Limerick.

Club
In spite of living in Cork city, Cahalane joined the Castlehaven football club in West Cork at a young age and played in all grades at juvenile and underage levels, winning two divisional under-21 championship medals and a county under-21 championship medal in 2010. He simultaneously played hurling with the St Finbarr's club. On 8 October 2012, Cahalane was at centre-back when Castlehaven defeated Duhallow by 1-7 to 0-9 to win the county senior championship. Castlehaven retained the title on 13 October 2013 after a two-point defeat of Nemo Rangers, with Cahalane winning a second championship medal.

Inter-county

Minor and under-21
Cahalane first played for Cork as a member of the minor football team in 2009. A dual player in his second season at minor, he won a Munster medal with the footballers after a one-point defeat of Kerry in the final. On 19 September 2010, Cahalane was at midfield when Cork were defeated by Tyrone in the All-Ireland final.

Cahalane continued his dual status with the Cork under-21 teams, however, he enjoyed little success with the hurling team. During his three years with the Cork under-21 footballers, the team remained undefeated in the provincial championship, with Cahalane winning successive Munster medals in 2011, 2012 and 2013. Cahalane was captain of the team for the third title. On 4 May 2013, Cahalane was at full-back when Cork suffered a 1-14 to 1-11 defeat by Galway in the All-Ireland final.

Senior
Cahalane made his senior debut for Cork in a Waterford Crystal Cup defeat of Kerry on 4 February 2012. He made his first start in a National League game in a four-point defeat of Galway on 18 March 2012, before making his first championship start at full-back later that season in an All-Ireland Qualifier against Wexford. The following season, Cahalane switched codes to Gaelic football, making his senior debut in a McGrath Cup game on 6 January 2013. He made his first start in a National League game in a 1-18 to 2-09 defeat by Dublin on 2 February 2013, before making his first championship start later that season in a Munster Championship quarter-final against Limerick. Cahalane underwent a double hip operation at the end of the season.

At the start of 2014, Cahalane committed to playing for both the Cork senior hurling and football teams for the upcoming season. Following Cork's defeat by Kerry in the Munster final, Cahalane suffered a large gash to his heel when he stepped on a medicinal vial in the shower in Páirc Uí Chaoimh. The injury threatened his participation in the provincial hurling final, however, on 13 July 2014, Cahalane won his first Munster medal after a six-point defeat of Limerick.

At the end of the 2014 season Cahalane decided to end his association with the Cork football team and to concentrate on hurling. On 9 July 2017, he won his second Munster medal following a 1-25 to 1-20 defeat of Clare in the final.

On 1 July 2018, Cahalane won a third Munster medal following a 2-24 to 3-19 defeat of Clare in the final.

Career statistics

Honours
University College Cork
All-Ireland Freshers Hurling Championship: 2012

Castlehaven
Cork Senior Football Championship: 2012, 2013
Cork Under-21 Football Championship: 2010

St. Finbarr's
Cork Premier Senior Hurling Championship: 2022

Cork
Munster Senior Hurling Championship: 2014, 2017, 2018
Munster Under-21 Football Championship: 2011, 2012, 2013 (c)
Munster Minor Football Championship: 2010

References

External link
Damien Cahalane profile at the Cork GAA website

1992 births
Living people
St Finbarr's hurlers
UCC hurlers
Castlehaven Gaelic footballers
Cork inter-county hurlers
Cork inter-county Gaelic footballers
Drinking establishment owners
Dual players
Hurling backs